State of Confusion is the twentieth studio album by the English rock group, the Kinks, released in 1983. The record features the single "Come Dancing", which hit #6 on the Billboard Hot 100 and was one of the band's biggest hit singles in the United States, equaling the 1965 peak of "Tired of Waiting for You". The album itself was a major success, peaking at #12 on the Billboard album charts.

While there have been at least 7 reissues of this album on CD in various countries (all with 4 bonus cuts), none of them have issued the extended "Come Dancing" 12-inch mix on CD (which contains an extended horn ending), which to this day is only available on vinyl. In addition, the extended 12-inch version of "Noise" has never been released on CD and is only available on vinyl. The UK 12-inch version of "Bernadette" has differences, including extra lyrics by Ray in the middle section. The album was certified gold in Canada by August, 1983.

Production 
The album was recorded between September 1982 and March 1983 at Konk Studios, London, and was produced by Ray Davies.

"Long Distance" and "Noise" were only released on cassette versions of the album. In 1984, "Long Distance" was released as one of the two B-sides on the "Do It Again" single in Germany (the other being "Guilty"). The song then appeared on both the LP and CD editions of the 1986 compilation album Come Dancing with The Kinks as the 13th track on the LP version and the 11th track on the CD version. Since then, it has made an appearance on the compilation album Picture Book and the box set, The Arista Years. It was the last Kinks album on which drummer Mick Avory appeared on all the tracks and was a full member of the band.

Reception 
The track "Long Distance" has generally received positive reviews from critics. Stephen Thomas Erlewine of AllMusic retrospectively praised the track as "wistful pop", and went on to call it a "terrific obscurity". Rolling Stone critic Parke Puterbaugh hailed the song as "astonishingly Dylanesque", and went on to say that "there's no excuse for omitting ['Long Distance' from the LP version of State of Confusion]".

Track listing 

Cassette edition

Personnel 
The Kinks
Ray Davies – lead vocals, rhythm guitar, synthesizer, piano
Dave Davies – lead guitar, vocals (lead vocals on "Bernadette")
Mick Avory – drums
Jim Rodford – bass guitar
Ian Gibbons – keyboards

Technical
Written and Produced by Raymond Douglas Davies
John Rollo – engineer
Damian Korner – engineer
Howard Fritzson – album design
Robert Ellis – photography

References

External links

1983 albums
The Kinks albums
Arista Records albums
Albums produced by Ray Davies